The 2012 Hungaroring GP3 Series round was a GP3 Series motor race held on July 28 and 29, 2012 at Hungaroring, Hungary. It was the sixth round of the 2012 GP3 season. The race supported the 2012 Hungarian Grand Prix.

Classification

Qualifying

Race 1

Race 2

Standings after the round 

 Drivers' Championship standings

 Teams' Championship standings

 Note: Only the top five positions are included for both sets of standings.

See also 
 2012 Hungarian Grand Prix
 2012 Hungaroring GP2 Series round

References 

Hungaroring
GP3